Sanhe is a historic town located in the northern west of Yanling County, Hunan, China; it was merged to Xiayang Town in November 2015.

History
As a historic division of Yanling, Sanhe belonged to Kangle (康乐乡) and Zhongzheng (中正乡) townships in 1949, Hedong (河东乡) and Hemo (河漠乡) townships in 1956. Merging Hedong, Hemo and Hexi (河西乡) three townships created Sanhe Commune (三河公社) in 1958. A part of Sanhe was divided to Hexi Commune (the former Wangjiadu Town, modern Luyuan Town). Sanhe Commune was reorganized as a township in 1984, and a town in 1996. On November 20, 2015, Sanhe Town was merged to Xiayang Town.

Subdivisions
It is divided into one community, Huojiaxu Community, and 11 villages: Xingguang Village, Taihe Village, Tuanxi Village, Xitai Village, Xiantianzhou Village, Tianping Village, Longkeng Village, Huojia Village, Miaoqian Village, Yuantou Village, and Dakeng Village.

References

Historic township-level divisions of Yanling County